Princes End railway station served the area of Princes End, West Midlands, from 1864 to 1916 on the Princes End branch line.

History
The station was opened on 14 September 1863 by the London and North Western Railway. It closed on 1 November 1890 but reopened on 1 July 1895, before closing permanently on 1 January 1916. The signal box survived into the 1980s.

References 

Former London and North Western Railway stations
Railway stations in Great Britain opened in 1864
Railway stations in Great Britain closed in 1890
Railway stations in Great Britain opened in 1895
Railway stations in Great Britain closed in 1916
1864 establishments in England
1916 disestablishments in England